Crust punk (also known as crust or stenchcore) is a form of music influenced by English punk rock and extreme metal. The style, which evolved in the early 1980s in England, often has songs with dark and pessimistic lyrics that linger on political and social ills. The term "crust" was coined by Hellbastard on their 1986 Ripper Crust demo.

Crust is partly defined by its "bassy" and "dirty" sound. It is often played at a fast tempo with occasional slow sections. Vocals are usually raspy screams, but can also be grunted/growled. Crust punk takes cues from the anarcho-punk of Crass and Discharge and the heavy metal of bands like Venom, Trouble, Hellhammer, Celtic Frost, Black Sabbath and Motörhead. While the term was first associated with Hellbastard, Amebix have been described as the originators of the style, along with Discharge and Antisect.

Characteristics

Instrumentation
Crust punk is a derivative form of anarcho-punk, mixed with metal riffs. The tempos are often fast, but just short of thrashcore or grindcore. However, many groups confine themselves to a crawling, sludgy pace. The overall musical sound has been described as being "stripped down". Drumming is typically done at high speed, with D-beats sometimes being used. In Sober Living for the Revolution: Hardcore Punk, Straight Edge, and Radical Politics, author Gabriel Kuhn referred to the genre as a "blend of 1977 British punk, roots culture and black metal", with the genre often taking influence from death metal, grindcore and powerviolence.

Vocals and lyrics
Vocals in crust punk are often shrieked or shouted, and may be shared between two or more vocalists. The lyrical content of crust punk tends to be bleak and nihilistic, yet politically engaged. Crust punk songs are often about nuclear war, militarism, animal rights, police, personal grievances, oppressive states and fascism. Amebix were also interested in various forms of mysticism and Gnosticism. Malcolm "Scruff" Lewty, guitarist and vocalist of Hellbastard, describes the distinction between metal and crust punk lyrics "Metal lyrics were so dumb, so far removed from daily life. Venom were going on about Satan... and bikes... and Satan... and women... and Satan! You know what? I never got up in the morning and said, 'Fuck yeah! Satan! Let's go and meet my disciples from Hell!' I'd switch on the TV and know I was going to see hundreds of people dying because there'd been an earthquake in the third world... and all these people starving to death while military expenditure still increased... That was — and still is — the reality of it. The whole heavy metal thing is just an escape from reality, into this other world of... well, bullshit basically."

History

Precursors
The initial inspiration for the crust punk scene came from the anarcho-punk of Crass and D-beat of Discharge. Swedish D-beat groups such as Crude SS, Skitslickers/Anti Cimex and Mob 47 and the Finnish Rattus were also early influences. Amebix also brought in influences from various post-punk bands, including Public Image Ltd., Bauhaus, Joy Division, and especially Killing Joke.

1980s 

Crust was founded by the bands Amebix and Antisect. The term "crust" was coined by Hellbastard on their 1986 Ripper Crust demo. In his book Trapped in a Scene, punk historian Ian Glasper said "Rippercrust is widely regarded as the first time the word 'crust' was used in the punk context, and hence the specific starting point of the whole crust punk genre, although some would attribute that accolade to the likes of Disorder, Chaos UK, and Amebix several years earlier. In the same book, he quoted the group's vocalist and guitarist Malcolm "Scruff" Lewty "A lot of people say we started the crust punk genre, but whatever. If they wanna say that, I don't mind, but I'm certainly no Malcolm McLaren, saying I invented something I didn't." However, in Sober Living for the Revolution: Hardcore Punk, Straight Edge, and Radical Politics, author Gabriel Kuhn Punk stated that the name of the genre came from the "crusty" appearance of the genre's practitioning bands. journalist Felix von Havoc contends that Doom, Excrement of War, Electro Hippies and Extreme Noise Terror were among the first bands to have the traditional UK "crust" sound. Additional subgenres of this style began to develop. Deviated Instinct, from Norwich, created "stenchcore", bringing "both the look and sound — dirty and metallic, respectively — to their natural conclusion". Initially an anarcho-punk group, they began to take increasing influence from metal. As vocalist Julian "Leggo" Kilsby comments "We were very much a part of the anarcho scene, to start with, very politically motivated... all the way through the band's existence, really, although it got less obvious as time went by. But I never really liked the straightforward 'War is bad...' lyrics that were so prevalent at the time, so as my writing skills improved I wanted to add more depth to our lyrics and make them more metaphorical; I'd always been into horror films, so that started to manifest itself in the imagery I was using.

Extreme Noise Terror is credited with developing this style into grindcore. However, Pete Hurley, the guitarist for the group, declared that he had no interest in being remembered as a pioneer of this style: "'grindcore' was a legendarily stupid term coined by a hyperactive kid from the West Midlands, and it had nothing to do with us whatsoever. ENT were, are, and — I suspect — always will be a hardcore punk band... not a grindcore band, a stenchcore band, a trampcore band, or any other sub-sub-sub-core genre-defining term you can come up with."

American crust punk began in New York City, also in the mid-1980s, with the work of Nausea. The group emerged from the Lower East Side squat scene and New York hardcore, living with Roger Miret of Agnostic Front. The early work of Neurosis, from San Francisco, also borrowed from Amebix, and inaugurated crust punk on the West Coast. Disrupt (Boston), Antischism (South Carolina), MISERY and Destroy (Minneapolis) were also significant U.S. crust groups.

1990s
An important American crust punk band was Aus Rotten from Pittsburgh, Pennsylvania. Crust punk also flourished in Minneapolis, shepherded by the Profane Existence label. In this period, the ethos of crust punk became particularly codified, with vegetarianism, feminism, and sometimes straight edge being prescribed by many of the figures in the scene. The powerviolence scene associated with Slap-a-Ham Records was in close proximity to crust punk, particularly in the case of Man Is the Bastard and Dropdead. Crust was also prominent in the American South, where Prank Records and CrimethInc. acted as focal points of the scene. The most well-known representative of Southern crust was His Hero Is Gone. Prominent crust punk groups (Driller Killer, Totalitär, Skitsystem, Wolfbrigade, and Disfear) also emerged from Sweden, which had always had a strong D-beat scene. Many of these groups developed in parallel with the much more commercial Scandinavian death metal scene.

2000s
Some notable crust bands in the 2000s include Iskra, Behind Enemy Lines, and Tragedy. The Spanish city A Coruña has a crust scene which includes bands as Black Panda, Ekkaia and Madame Germen. In 2017, Bandcamp Daily wrote that Fluff Fest, held in Czechia since 2000, has become a "summer ritual" for many fans of crust punk in Europe.

Relations with other genres

Black metal
Crust punk groups, such as Antisect, Sacrilege and Anti System took some influence from early black metal bands like Venom, Hellhammer, and Celtic Frost, while Amebix's lead vocalist and guitarist sent his band's early demo tape to Cronos of Venom, who replied by saying "We'll rip you off". Similarly, Bathory was initially inspired by crust punk as well as heavy metal.

Blackened crust
Crust punk was affected by a second wave of black metal in the 1990s, with some bands emphasizing these black metal elements. Iskra are probably the most obvious example of second wave black metal-influenced crust punk; Iskra coined their own phrase "blackened crust" to describe their new style. The Japanese group Gallhammer also fused crust punk with black metal while the English band Fukpig has been said to have elements of crust punk, black metal, and grindcore. Germany's Downfall of Gaia has been described as mixing crustgrind and black metal, along with elements of sludge metal, doom metal and post-metal. North Carolina's Young and in the Way have been playing blackened crust since their formation in 2009. In addition, Norwegian band Darkthrone have incorporated crust punk traits in their mid-to-late 2000s material. As Daniel Ekeroth wrote in 2008,

Red and anarchist black metal
Red and anarchist black metal (also known as RABM or anarchist black metal) is a subgenre that melds black metal with anarchist crust punk, promoting ideologies such as anarchism, environmentalism, or Marxism. Artists labelled RABM include Iskra, Panopticon, Skagos, Storm of Sedition, Not A Cost, Black Kronstadt, and Vidargangr.

Crack rock steady
Crack rock steady is a punk rock fusion-genre, which combines elements of crust punk and ska punk. Lyrics often focus on themes such as drug-use, religion, politics and social issues. Other genres sometimes incorporated in conjunction with the style include hardcore punk  and heavy metal. Notable bands within the genre include Choking Victim, Leftöver Crack, Morning Glory and Star Fucking Hipsters.

Crustcore
Crustcore (also known as crusty hardcore), is a sub-genre of crust punk that takes influence from hardcore punk and sometimes thrashcore. Felix Havok described Extreme Noise Terror's segment of the "Earslaughter" split album with Chaos UK as the first album in the genre. Crustcore bands include Extreme Noise Terror, Doom, Disrupt, Wolfbrigade, Neurosis, Baptists, Discharge and Filth.

Grindcore
Crust punk had a major impact on grindcore's emergence. The first grindcore, practiced by the British bands such as Napalm Death and Extreme Noise Terror emerged from the crust punk scene. This early style is sometimes dubbed "crustgrind".

Neo crust
Neo crust is a genre that merges crust punk with elements of various extreme music styles including black metal, screamo, post-rock, hardcore punk, death metal and doom metal. Unlike most other punk–metal fusion genres, neo-crust's sound is neither distinctively rooted in punk or metal, instead frequently shifting between the two, disregarding genre boundaries. It is often dark and heavy however also melodic. Notable bands include His Hero is Gone, Tragedy, Fall of Efrafa and From Ashes Rise.

Culture 

Crust punks are associated with a DIY-oriented branch of punk garb. Similar to anarcho-punk, most clothing is black in color. Denim jackets and hooded sweatshirts with sewn-on patches, or vests covered in studs, spikes and band patches are characteristic elements of the crust punk style of dress or pants covered in band patches. Crust punks also sometimes wear dreadlocks and piercings. Julian "Leggo" Kilsby of Deviated Instinct describes crust as "a punk-y biker look, more akin to Mad Max. Mad Max 2 is the crustiest film ever made!"

Members of the sub-culture are generally outspokenly political, possessing anarchist and anti-consumerist views.

See also 
List of crust punk bands
Anarcho-punk
Grindcore
D-beat
Gutter punk
Animal rights and punk subculture

References

Further reading 
Ekeroth, Daniel (2008). Swedish Death Metal. Bazillion Points Books. 
Glasper, Ian (2004). Burning Britain: The History of UK Punk 1980-1984. Cherry Red Books. 
Glasper, Ian (2006). The Day the Country Died: A History of Anarcho Punk 1980 to 1984. Cherry Red Books. 
Glasper, Ian (2009). Trapped in a Scene: UK Hardcore 1985-1989. Cherry Red Books. 
"In Grind We Crust," Terrorizer #181, March 2009, p. 46, 51.
Mudian, Albert (2000). Choosing Death: The Improbable History of Death Metal and Grindcore. Feral House. 
Profane Existence (1997). Making Punk a Threat Again: Profane Existence: Best Cuts 1989-1993. Loincloth. ASIN: B000J2M8GS

 
Anarcho-punk
Extreme metal
English styles of music
British rock music genres